Sir George Macpherson-Grant, 1st Baronet (1781–1846), of Ballindalloch, Banff and Invereshie, Inverness, Scotland, was a politician.

He was a Member of Parliament (MP) for Sutherland 29 September 1809 – 1812 and 6 March 1816 – 1826.

References

|-

1781 births
1846 deaths
Baronets in the Baronetage of the United Kingdom
Members of the Parliament of the United Kingdom for Highland constituencies
People from Inverness
People from Banff, Aberdeenshire
UK MPs 1807–1812
UK MPs 1812–1818
UK MPs 1818–1820
UK MPs 1820–1826